Leptophis ahaetulla, commonly known as the lora or parrot snake, is a species of medium-sized slender snake of the family Colubridae. It is endemic to Central America and northern South America.

Distribution
Central America: Belize, Costa Rica, El Salvador, Guatemala, Honduras, southern Mexico, Nicaragua, Panama.
South America: Argentina, Bolivia, Brazil, Colombia, Ecuador, French Guiana, Paraguay, Peru, Trinidad and Tobago, Uruguay, Venezuela.

Description

Dorsally, Leptophis ahaetulla is bright green, golden, or bronzy. The keels of the dorsal scales are black or dark brown. The head shields and the dorsal scales may be edged with black. On each side of the head is a black streak which passes through the eye. The upper lip and the belly are white or yellow. The species was thought to be non-venomous, but it is mildly venomous with localized pain, swelling and a feeling "pins and needles" being the symptoms of envenomation. Symptoms disappear after a few hours.

The head is elongated and distinct from the neck. The eye is large with a round pupil. The body is slender, and the tail is long.

The dorsal scales are arranged in 15 rows at mid-body and are strongly keeled except in the first row on each side (the row adjacent to the ventrals), where they are smooth.  They are also smooth on the neck and tail.

Ventrals 151-167 are strongly angulate at the sides, the anal plate is divided, and subcaudals 140-173 are divided.

The loreal scale is absent, and the prefrontals extend through the loreal region to contact the upper labials. There are usually 2 postoculars, and the temporals are 1 + 2. There are 8-9 upper labials, of which the 4th & 5th (or 5th & 6th) enter the eye. The anterior chin shields are shorter than the posterior chin shields.

Subspecies

Leptophis ahaetulla has currently ten recognized subspecies, including the nominotypical subspecies:
Leptophis ahaetulla ahaetulla (Linnaeus, 1758)
Leptophis ahaetulla bocourti Boulenger, 1898
Leptophis ahaetulla bolivianus Oliver, 1942
Leptophis ahaetulla chocoensis Oliver, 1942
Leptophis ahaetulla liocercus  (Wied, 1824)
Leptophis ahaetulla marginatus (Cope, 1862)
Leptophis ahaetulla nigromarginatus (Günther, 1866) - black-skinned parrot snake 
Leptophis ahaetulla occidentalis (Günther, 1859)
Leptophis ahaetulla ortonii  Cope, 1876
Leptophis ahaetulla praestans (Cope, 1868)

Leptophis coeruleodorsus Oliver, 1942 was formerly recognized as Leptophis ahaetulla coeruleodorsus.

Diet
It feeds on lizards, frogs, frog eggs, insects (such as grasshoppers), and small birds and their eggs. They are also known to show cannibalism and feed on other snakes which is a rare behaviour.

References

Further reading
Freiberg, M. 1982. Snakes of South America. T.F.H. Publications. Hong Kong. 189 pp. . (Leptophis ahaetulla, pp. 80, 101, 133 + photograph on p. 54.)
 Linnaeus, C. 1758. Systema naturæ per regna tria naturæ, secundum classes, ordines, genera, species, cum characteribus, differentiis, synonymis, locis. Tomus I. Editio Decima, Reformata. L. Salvius. Stockholm. 824 pp. ("Coluber Ahætulla", p. 225.)

Colubrids
Snakes of Central America
Snakes of South America
Reptiles of Trinidad and Tobago
Taxa named by Carl Linnaeus
Reptiles described in 1758
Reptiles of Belize
Reptiles of Mexico